Ctenomorpha is a genus of phasmids belonging to the family Phasmatidae.

The species of this genus are found in Australia.

Speciese (incomplete):

Ctenomorpha gargantua 
Ctenomorpha marginipennis

References

Phasmatidae
Phasmatodea genera